Wujie Dam is a concrete gravity dam on the Zhuoshui River in Ren'ai Township, Nantou County, Taiwan. The dam was built in two stages, from 1919 to 1922 and 1927–1934, and serves primarily to divert water from the Zhuoshui River to a storage reservoir at Sun Moon Lake and its associated hydroelectric projects (Mingtan Pumped Storage Hydro Power Plant and Minhu Pumped Storage Hydro Power Station). During the Japanese occupation of Taiwan it was known as Bukai Dam.

See also
 List of dams and reservoirs in Taiwan
 Wushoh Dam

References

1934 establishments in Taiwan
Dams completed in 1934
Dams in Nantou County
Gravity dams